Marco Rodriguez may refer to:

 Marco Rodríguez (actor) (born 1953), Hispanic-American actor
 Marco Antonio Rodríguez (born 1973), Mexican football referee
 Marco Antonio Rodríguez (racewalker) (born 1994), Bolivian racewalker
 Marco Rodriguez, known as Khushnood Butt outside Japan, a video game character from Garou: Mark of the Wolves
 Marco Rodríguez (footballer), El Salvadorian football player for A.D. Chalatenango